Jon V. Jaqua (born September 10, 1948) is a former American football safety in the National Football League for the Washington Redskins.  He played college football at Lewis & Clark College.

He is the father of American soccer player Nate Jaqua who  played for Seattle Sounders FC and the United States men's national team.

1948 births
Living people
Sportspeople from Eugene, Oregon
Lewis & Clark Pioneers football players
American football safeties
Washington Redskins players
Sheldon High School (Eugene, Oregon) alumni